William Walters (c.1833–1912) was an English churchman, Archdeacon of Worcester from 1889 to 1911.
  
Walters was educated at Eton and Christ Church, Oxford, where he matriculated in 1850 aged 17, and graduated B.A. in 1854. He was ordained in 1858. After a curacy at Hanley Castle he held incumbencies at Pershore, Alvechurch and  Malvern Wells.

References

People educated at Eton College
Alumni of Christ Church, Oxford
Archdeacons of Worcester
19th-century English Anglican priests
1912 deaths
Year of birth uncertain